Reginaldo Paes Leme Ferreira, best known as Régis (born 23 April 1965) is a Brazilian former  football (soccer) player, who played as a goalkeeper, best known for his performances for Vasco da Gama and Paraná. He was born in Itumbiara, Goiás State.

Honours
Vasco da Gama
Campeonato Brasileiro (1989)
Campeonato Carioca (1987, 1988)

Paraná
Campeonato Paranaense (1993, 1994, 1995, 1996, 1997)

References

1965 births
Living people
1987 Copa América players
Brazil international footballers
Brazilian footballers
Campeonato Brasileiro Série A players
CR Vasco da Gama players
Association football goalkeepers
Paraná Clube players
Sportspeople from Goiás